Charles Johnstone (–1800) was an Irish novelist. Prevented by deafness from practising at the Irish Bar, he went to India, where he was proprietor of a newspaper. He wrote one successful book, Chrysal, or the Adventures of a Guinea, a somewhat sombre satire.

Life
Born at Carrigogunnell, County Limerick about 1719, he was educated at Trinity College, Dublin, but is not known to have taken a degree. He was called to the bar, but extreme deafness prevented his practice except as a chamber lawyer, where he did not succeed. He began to write as a living.

In May 1782, Johnstone sailed for India, with a dangerous shipwreck on the voyage. He found employment in writing for the Bengal newspaper press, under the signature of "Oneiropolos". He became in time joint proprietor of a journal, and prospered. He died at Calcutta about 1800.

Works
Johnstone's major work, entitled Chrysal, or the Adventures of a Guinea, and frequently reprinted, appeared in 4 vols., London, 1760–65. The first and second volumes had been written during a visit to George Edgcumbe, 3rd Baron Edgcumbe in Devon. The book, a succès de scandale, claimed to reveal political secrets, and to expose the profligacy of well-known public characters.

Johnstone was also the author of:
 The Reverie, or a Flight to the Paradise of Fools, 2 vols. London, 1762.
 The History of Arsaces, Prince of Betlis, 2 vols. 1774. 
 The Pilgrim, or a Picture of Life, 2 vols. 1775. 
 History of John Juniper, Esq., alias Juniper Jack, 3 vols. 1781.

See also
Hellfire Club

References

Notes

Attribution

External links

1719 births
1800 deaths
18th-century Irish novelists
Irish male novelists
18th-century Irish male writers